Ebenezer "Poker Face" Robertson Goodfellow (April 9, 1907 – September 10, 1985) was a Canadian professional ice hockey player and coach. Goodfellow played in the National Hockey League (NHL) for fourteen seasons with the Detroit Red Wings from 1929 to 1944 as both a forward and defenceman. Goodfellow helped the Red Wings win three Stanley Cups, back to back in 1935–36 and 1936–37, and another in 1942–43. He was captain of the Wings for five seasons, including winning the first Red Wings MVP as a defenseman in 1939-40. He played on the team until 1942 when he was succeeded by Syd Howe as team captain. Goodfellow was the first Red Wing to have won the NHL's Hart Trophy (MVP) for the 1939–40 season. Goodfellow was the first Red Wing to receive this award and one of only four Red Wings in history to win the Hart; the other three being six-time winner Gordie Howe, Sid Abel (1949) and Sergei Fedorov (1994). After retiring from playing, Goodfellow coached in the American Hockey League (AHL) and later with the Chicago Black Hawks of the NHL.

Hockey career

While still a junior, Goodfellow signed a contract with the professional Saskatoon Sheiks of the Western Canada Hockey League on December 25, 1924. When Saskatoon called him up in December 1926, he refused to report and played senior hockey with the Ottawa Montagnards of the Ottawa City Hockey League instead. While playing in Ottawa, his professional rights were traded to Detroit Olympics of the AHL for $4,000 in February 1927. Goodfellow remained in Ottawa and was a member of the Montagnards' 1927–28 senior championship team. In 1928, he joined the Olympics and played with the club for one season. The following year, he signed with the Detroit Cougars of the NHL, starting a fourteen-year career in the NHL with the franchise. Goodfellow was a high-scoring forward and the original center in a famous line with Herbie Lewis and Larry Aurie. During the 1930–31 season, he scored 25 goals (a franchise record that stood for fourteen years) and 48 points and was second to Howie Morenz in overall league scoring.  After three seasons Ebbie switched to defence for the benefit of the team. Position switches were (and are) rare in the NHL, but it was as a defenceman that he won the Hart Memorial Trophy in 1940 and three All-Star Teams.

Goodfellow displayed even more versatility during the 1942–43 season. He missed most of the season due to injury, but when coach Jack Adams was suspended during the 1943 playoffs, Goodfellow agreed to serve as coach during the suspension. Detroit went on to win the Stanley Cup in 1943, and Goodfellow's name was engraved on the Cup for a third and final time. He was one of the last NHL players to have his name engraved on the Stanley Cup as both player and coach as league rules changed and playing coaches were eliminated. Goodfellow retired to the private sector the following season after knee problems began to slow him down.

At the start of the 1947-48 season he was persuaded out of retirement by the St. Louis Flyers of the American Hockey League (AHL).  In his two years as coach of the Flyers, Ebbie was able to lead them from last place to the AHL Western Division Championship, the team's highest achievement at that time.  Succeeding Charlie Conacher, Goodfellow became the coach of the Chicago Black Hawks for the seasons of 1950–51 and 1951–52.  After little success with the Black Hawks, Goodfellow finally retired from the NHL for good.

Goodfellow was a founding member of the Detroit Red Wings Alumni Association, a charitable organization formed in 1959 and still in operation today.  Goodfellow was inducted into the Hockey Hall of Fame in 1963 and served for twenty-one years on the Hockey Hall of Fame selection committee.  He was an avid golfer and one time caddy master at Oakland Hills Country Club in Bloomfield Hills, Michigan. He died of cancer on September 10, 1985 in Sarasota, Florida and is buried at White Chapel Cemetery in Troy, Michigan.

Career statistics

Regular season and playoffs

* Stanley Cup Champion.

Awards
 NHL Second All-Star Team - 1935–36
 NHL First All-Star Team - 1936–37, 1939–40
 Hart Trophy (MVP) - 1939–40
 Hockey Hall of Fame - 1963
 Ottawa Sports Hall of Fame
 Michigan Sports Hall of Fame - 1968

Coaching record

References

External links
 

1907 births
1985 deaths
Canadian ice hockey coaches
Canadian ice hockey defencemen
Chicago Blackhawks coaches
Detroit Cougars players
Detroit Falcons players
Detroit Red Wings captains
Detroit Red Wings players
Hart Memorial Trophy winners
Hockey Hall of Fame inductees
Ice hockey people from Ottawa
Stanley Cup champions